Stupino may refer to:
Stupino Urban Settlement, a municipal formation which the town of Stupino, Stupinsky District, Moscow Oblast, Russia is incorporated as
Stupino (inhabited locality), several inhabited localities in Russia
Stupino Airfield, an airport and a former air base in Russia

See also
Stupinsky (disambiguation)